WXJZ (100.9 FM) is a commercial radio station in Gainesville, Florida, broadcasting to the Gainesville-Ocala, Florida area. The station is owned by MARC Radio Group Gainesville, LLC and broadcasts a classic hits format branded as "Classic Hits 100.9".

History
The station started on 104.9 MHz before moving to the frequency of the former WYGC "Gator Country 100.9".  Simultaneously, WYGC moved to WXJZ's 104.9 frequency. On December 26, 2013, sister station WBXY's dance format moved over to the 100.9 signal, while JVC simulcasted the 99.5 signal until it was spun off to another company in January 2014. On September 12, 2015, at Midnight, after stunting throughout the 11th with patriotic music and country songs in a tribute to the 9/11 terrorist attacks, JVC flipped the station to Soft AC and bought the "Smooth 100.9" brand back to the market, with "Sailing" by Christopher Cross as its first song after the switch.

On May 23, 2016, at 6 A.M., WXJZ flipped to a simulcast of former sister station WYGC and rebranded as "100.9 WOW FM".  The simulcast ended on August 4, 2016, at midnight as WYGC flipped to a News/Talk format.

On August 15, 2017, WXJZ was sold to the MARC Radio Group, an upstart radio broadcaster based in Winter Park, from JVC Broadcasting. The "WOW 100.9" rebranding was renamed "Classic Hits 100.9".

Previous Logo

References

External links

XJZ
Radio stations established in 1982
1982 establishments in Florida